Ompah is a village in eastern Ontario, Canada, located in the township of North Frontenac, approximately  southwest of Ottawa. The village is situated close to many lakes including Palmerston Lake, Canonto Lake, Sunday Lake, and Mosque Lake.

Ompah is located along a traditional Native portage between Palmerston Lake and the Mississippi River, roughly along what is now River Road. Ompah is located on Highway 509 between Plevna and Snow Road Station along the original colonization "Snow Road".

Ompah's claim to fame was the Ompah Stomp, a weekend long party held every Labour Day weekend for many years. It would typically feature popular country music stars. The stomp was shut down after interest declined due to the rising popularity of the Havelock Country Jamboree in nearby Havelock, Ontario.

An old fire tower once stood south of the village and was known as Ompah Tower back in the 1950s.

Etymology 

The community name derives from Algonquian for "long step" or "long portage."

Amenities 

Amenities include a fire station, library, helipad, marina, motels, a restaurant, taverns, and a general store.

References

Communities in Frontenac County